Lee In-Sik  (born 14 February 1983) is a South Korean football footballer. (formerly Jeonbuk Hyundai, Gimhae FC, Cheonan City FC and Jeju United).

In November 2009, he moved to Jeju United.

References

External links 
 

1983 births
Living people
South Korean footballers
Jeju United FC players
K League 1 players
Korea National League players
China League One players
South Korean expatriate footballers
Expatriate footballers in China
South Korean expatriate sportspeople in China
South Korean expatriate sportspeople in Thailand
Expatriate footballers in Thailand
Jeonbuk Hyundai Motors players
Association football defenders